James George Beaney (15 January 1828 in Canterbury – 30 June 1891 in Melbourne) was an English-born surgeon, politician and philanthropist in Australia, member of the Victorian Legislative Council from March 1883 until his death.

Early life
Beaney was born in Canterbury, Kent, England, where he was educated, and studied surgery with Mr. W. J. Cooper. He was afterwards a student at the University of Edinburgh, at Paris, and at Guy's Hospital. He qualified as surgeon in Edinburgh and travelled to Australia before being gazetted assistant surgeon to the 3rd Regiment (the Scots Guards). He served at Gibraltar and later as staff surgeon to the Turkish contingent in the Crimean War. After the campaign he made several trips to America.

Medical career in Australia
Beaney travelled to Melbourne, where in 1858 he became assistant to Dr. John Maund, at whose death he succeeded to his practice. In 1860 he was appointed surgeon to the Melbourne Hospital, surgeon to the Royal Victorian Artillery (holding the post for most of his life), and was elected a member of the Royal Society of Victoria. He was again elected surgeon to the hospital and banqueted at the town hall in 1875, and was subsequently re-elected despite the strenuous opposition of a large section of the medical profession. In 1878 Dr. Beaney visited England with a semi-official commission from the Berry Government to report on medical matters. He was a member of the Medical Society of Victoria, publishing numerous papers on medical subjects, and served as a member of the Victorian Legislative Council for the North Yarra Province in 1883–91.

Political career in Australia
In 1883, after a severe contest, he was elected to the Victorian Legislative Council for the North Yarra Province, and was re-elected for a period of six years, in 1885, when he defeated the James Munro, the late Premier of Victoria. Dr. Beaney was the author of several medical works, including "Contributions to Conservative Surgery". He was munificent in his donations to public institutions in his native place, and offered various medical prizes.

Legacy

He died in Melbourne on 30 June 1891, in his will Beaney left £10,000 for the creation of "The Beaney Institute for the Education of the Working Man" in Canterbury, England. Other parts of his estate went to the University of Melbourne, Melbourne hospitals and charities.

Notes

References
 Death of Dr. Beaney, The Leader, (Saturday, 4 July 1891), p.36.
 The Will of Dr. Beaney, The Leader, (Saturday, 11 July 1891), p.42.
 The University of Melbourne: The Beaney Scholarships, The Age, (Thursday, 6 October 1892), p.7.

External links

 History of James Bearney at the Melbourne Hospital

1828 births
1891 deaths
Members of the Victorian Legislative Council
English philanthropists
English surgeons
People from Canterbury
Alumni of the University of Edinburgh
19th-century Australian politicians
English emigrants to colonial Australia
19th-century British philanthropists